Soul Drums is the debut album by drummer Bernard "Pretty" Purdie, recorded for the Date label in 1967. The single "Funky Donkey" reached No. 87 on the Billboard Hot 100 in 1967.

Reception

The review by Jason Ankeny of AllMusic states:

Track listing
All compositions by Bernard Purdie except where indicated
 "Soul Drums" – 3:33  
 "Bee 'N' Tee" (Purdie, Richard Tee) – 2:56  
 "Caravan" (Duke Ellington, Irving Mills, Juan Tizol) – 2:41  
 "Soul Bossa Nova" (Purdie, Tee) – 2:46  
 "Jimmy's Back" (Purdie, James Tyrell) – 2:37  
 "Funky Donkey" – 3:01  
 "Bill's Groove" – 2:44  
 "On the Outskirts of Minitown" – 3:19  
 "Testifyin'" (Purdie, Tee) – 2:37  
 "Modern Jive" (Purdie, Tee) – 2:46  
 "Blow Your Lid (But Watch Your Cool)" – 2:40  
 "Alexander's Ragtime Band" (Irving Berlin) – 4:03 Bonus track on CD reissue  
 "Fickle Finger of Fate" (Billy Jackson, Richard Rome, James Wisner) – 1:53 Bonus track on CD reissue   
 "Genuine John" (Cornell Dupree, Chuck Rainey) – 2:44 Bonus track on CD reissue   
 "Soul Clappin'" (Purdie, Tee) – 2:40 Bonus track on CD reissue   
 "Groovin'" (Eddie Brigati, Felix Cavaliere) – 3:38 Bonus track on CD reissue   
 "If You Never Cried" (Jerome Jackson) – 3:08 Bonus track on CD reissue   
 "Stop" (Jerry Ragovoy, Mort Shuman) – 2:48 Bonus track on CD reissue   
 "Time Is Tight" (Booker T. Jones, Al Jackson Jr., Donald "Duck" Dunn, Steve Cropper) – 2:40 Bonus track on CD reissue

Personnel
Bernard "Pretty" Purdie – drums, shouting vocals
Seldon Powell – tenor saxophone, flute
Buddy Lucas – tenor saxophone, flute, baritone saxophone, shouting vocals
Billy Butler – guitar
Eric Gale – guitar
Richard Tee – piano, Hammond organ, arranger
Bob Bushnell – bass

References

Bernard Purdie albums
1967 debut albums
Jazz-funk albums